The Archdeacon of Bristol is a senior ecclesiastical officer within the Diocese of Bristol. The archdeaconry was created – within the Diocese of Gloucester and Bristol – by Order in Council on 7 October 1836 and became part of the re-erected Diocese of Bristol on 8 February 1898.

As archdeacon she or he is responsible for the disciplinary supervision of the clergy within three area deaneries: Bristol City, Bristol South and Bristol West.

List of archdeacons
 1836–1873: Thomas Thorp
 1873–1881: Henry Randall
 1881–1891: John Norris
 1891–1904: Hemming Robeson
 In 1898, the archdeaconry was transferred from Gloucester & Bristol diocese to the new Diocese of Bristol.
 1904–1910: Ravenscroft Stewart
 1910–1921: James Tetley
 1921–1927: Charles Dickinson
 1927–1938: William Welchman (afterwards archdeacon emeritus)
 1938–1941 (res.): Charles Alford
 1941–1950: Ivor Watkins (Bishop suffragan of Malmesbury from 1946)
 1950–1967: Percy Reddick (afterwards archdeacon emeritus)
 1967–1979: Leslie Williams (afterwards archdeacon emeritus)
 1979–1990: Anthony Balmforth (afterwards archdeacon emeritus)
 1990–1998: David Banfield
 1999–July 2012: Tim McClure
 December 20121 June 2018: Christine Froude, Archdeacon of Malmesbury (Acting)
from January 2013 until 1 April 2015, Derek Chedzey was part-time Assistant Archdeacon for the diocese.
July 2018July 2019: Michael Johnson (Acting; for a one-year term)
4 September 2019present: Neil Warwick

References 

Lists of Anglicans
 
Diocese of Bristol
Lists of English people